Hydrogenated MDI (H12MDI or 4,4′-diisocyanato dicyclohexylmethane) is an organic compound in the class known as isocyanates. More specifically, it is an aliphatic diisocyanate. It is a water white liquid at room temperature and is manufactured in relatively small quantities. It is also known as 4,4'-methylenedi(cyclohexyl isocyanate) or methylene bis(4-cyclohexylisocyanate) and has the formula CH2[(C6H10)NCO]2.

Manufacture
The product is manufactured by hydrogenation of methylene diphenyl diisocyanate. It may also be manufactured by phosgenation of 4,4-Diaminodicyclohexylmethane.

Uses
Aliphatic diisocyanates are not used in the production of polyurethane foam as the cost is too high and foam is very much a commodity. It is used in special applications for polyurethane, such as enamel coatings which are resistant to abrasion and degradation from ultraviolet light. There are also multiple patents where prepolymers based on it are used in golf ball production. It is available commercially under the tradename of Desmodur W from Covestro - formerly Bayer Material Science. It is used as a reactive building block for the preparation of other chemical products such as isocyanate terminated prepolymers and other urethane polymers. The isocyanate groups can undergo addition reactions at room temperature with compounds which contain active hydrogens especially amines and polyols. Polyurethane resins based on this diisocyanate have good flexibility and mechanical strength. The polymers formed tend to have abrasion and hydrolysis resistance as well as retaining gloss and physical properties upon weathering. The resins based on this material are useful in coatings for flooring, roofing, maintenance and adhesives, and sealants. They find use in the coatings, adhesives, sealants and elastomers (CASE) applications. A prepolymer made from H12MDI and incorporating dimethylol propionic acid can also be converted to light stable polyurethane dispersions.

See also
 Hexamethylene diisocyanate
 Methylene diphenyl diisocyanate
 Toluene diisocyanate
 Isophorone diisocyanate

References

Isocyanates
Monomers
Cyclohexanes
Organic compounds